The Gang of Eight (Spanish:La banda de los ocho) is a 1962 Mexican-Spanish comedy film directed by Tulio Demicheli.

Cast
 Cesáreo Quezadas 'Pulgarcito' 
 Luz Romero 
 Antonio Vela as Quique  
 Mari Loli Cobos as Cobo, Mari Loli 
 Cristina Villerino
 Fernando Alcaide 
 Mercedes Barranco 
 José María Caffarel 
 José Calvo
 José Vicente Cerrudo 
 Francisco Díaz 
 Ángel Díaz 
 Alfonso Gallardo
 Luis Induni 
 Nicolás D. Perchicot
 Mary Paz Pondal 
 María Luisa Ponte 
 Francisco Vázquez 
 Ángel Álvarez

References

Bibliography
 John King & Nissa Torrents. The Garden of Forking Paths: Argentine Cinema. British Film Institute, 1988.

External links 

1962 films
Mexican comedy films
Spanish comedy films
1962 comedy films
1960s Spanish-language films
Films directed by Tulio Demicheli
1960s Spanish films
1960s Mexican films